Mukesh Shukla, commonly referred to as Shumuk, is a businessman, entrepreneur, and politician in Uganda. He was reported in 2012 to be one of the wealthiest individuals in Uganda.

History
His father was a revenue officer with the Uganda Revenue Authority from 1959 until 1986. The family has been in the business of aluminum saucepans since 1939.

Businesses and investments
Shukla's businesses are organized under the Shumuk Group. The individual companies include the following:

 A company that manufactures aluminum cooking utensils
 Multiple warehouses in Kampala and other Ugandan towns
 A milk-processing plant
 Commercial buildings in Kampala and other urban areas of Uganda
 A company that imports and sells pre-owned automobiles
 A money-lending business
 A foreign exchange bureau
 Several hotels in Kampala and other Ugandan locations

Net worth
In 2012, the New Vision newspaper estimated his net worth at approximately US$100 million.

Political career
In the 2016 political season, Shukla contested for the chairmanship of the ruling National Resistance Movement's entrepreneurs league against the current incumbent, Hassan Basajjabalaba.

See also
 Uganda People's Defense Force
 Indians in Uganda

References

External links
Richard Mwami faces Mukesh Shukla in Uganda Cricket Association elections

Living people
1962 births
Ugandan businesspeople in real estate
Ugandan people of Indian descent
People from Arua District
People from Northern Region, Uganda
National Resistance Movement politicians
People from West Nile sub-region